Chiru is an alternate name for the Tibetan antelope.

It may also refer to:

Chiru, an alternate name for Bandar-e Chiruiyeh, a village in Iran.
Chiru, the lead character in the 2010 Indian film Chirru
Chiru, a nickname for the Indian actor Chiranjeevi